Sebastian Somerset (15 January 2001) is a British international swimmer who became the British Champion for the 50 metres backstroke in 2022. He has lived in Canada, Australia and England, and is currently a student at the University of California, Berkeley.

Biography
Somerset was educated at Rundle College High School and the University of California, Berkeley. He was a member of the Canadian Junior team and competed in the 2018 Junior Pan Pacific Championships, the 2018 Summer Youth Olympics and the 2019 Junior World Championships for Canada.

In 2022, he became the British champion when claiming the gold medal over 50 metres backstroke at the 2022 British Swimming Championships. He will make his senior British debut at the 2022 European Aquatics Championships.

References

2001 births
Living people
English male swimmers
British male swimmers
Canadian male swimmers
Sportspeople from Birmingham, West Midlands
Swimmers at the 2018 Summer Youth Olympics
California Golden Bears men's swimmers